The 2010 Farmers Classic, presented by Mercedes-Benz, was a tennis tournament played on outdoor hard courts. It was the 84th edition of the Los Angeles Open, and was part of the Olympus US Open Series of the 2010 ATP World Tour. It took place at the Los Angeles Tennis Center in Los Angeles, United States, from July 26 through August 1, 2010. Sam Querrey defeated Andy Murray for the singles title. Bob and Mike Bryan won the doubles championship over Eric Butorac and Jean-Julien Rojer, who was playing on his college court. It marked the first time in the 84-year history of the tournament that both the singles and doubles championships were successfully defended. The twin brothers also set the record of 62 career doubles titles on the ATP Tour.

Jim Courier was the Tournament Honoree in a special ceremony on opening night, Monday, July 26.  This year's Stars Under the Stars gala featured Andre Agassi vs. John McEnroe, along with Jim Courier, Michael Chang and Pam Shriver; comedian Jon Lovitz and rock star Gavin Rossdale on Saturday, July 24. The tournament also featured the Starry Night with Keith Urban and the Avett Brothers on July 23. Additionally, the "KLOS Rocking the Net starring Bret Michaels" show featuring Tesla scheduled for Monday, August 2, at the L.A. Tennis Center was postponed until Sunday, October 24.

The prize money is $111,950 for the singles winner and $34,000 for the doubles winner. Live television coverage was provided by ESPN2 and Tennis Channel.

ATP entrants

Seeds

Seedings based on the July 19, 2010 rankings.

Other entrants
The following players received wildcards into the singles main draw
  James Blake
  Andy Murray
  Ryan Sweeting

The following players received special exempt into the singles main draw:
  Kevin Anderson

The following players received entry from the qualifying draw:
  Ilija Bozoljac
  Somdev Devvarman
  Steve Johnson
  Giovanni Lapentti (as a Lucky loser)
  Tim Smyczek

Finals

Singles

 Sam Querrey defeated  Andy Murray, 5–7, 7–6(7–2), 6–3
It was Querrey's 4th title of the year and 6th of his career. It was his second consecutive win at Los Angeles.

Doubles

 Bob Bryan /  Mike Bryan defeated  Eric Butorac /  Jean-Julien Rojer, 6–7(6–8), 6–2, [10–7]
Their sixth title at Farmers Classic.

Notes
 Novak Djokovic, Radek Štěpánek, and Mardy Fish (singles) withdrew from the tournament.

References

External links
Official website